Pliohippus (Greek  ("more") and  ("horse")) is an extinct genus of Equidae, the "horse family". Pliohippus arose in the middle Miocene, around 15 million years ago. The long and slim limbs of Pliohippus reveal a quick-footed steppe animal. While some specimens have one toe per leg, others have three (the main toe and two non-functional side toes).

Until recently, because of its many anatomical similarities, Pliohippus was believed to be the ancestor of the present-day horse and its relatives in Equus. Although Pliohippus clearly is an equid and thus related to Equus, its skull had deep facial fossae, a feature not found in any member of Equus. Additionally, its teeth were strongly curved, unlike the very straight teeth of modern horses. Consequently, it is unlikely to be the ancestor of the modern horse; instead, it is likely to be the ancestor of Astrohippus. Pliohippus stood approximately 1.25 metres, similar to the modern horse. Also like the modern horse, Pliohippus was a grazer that fed on steppe grasses of the North American plains it inhabited.

Fossils of Pliohippus have been found at many late Miocene localities in Colorado, the Great Plains (Nebraska, including Ashfall Fossil Beds and the Dakotas) and also Canada. Pliohippus has been found beside Neohipparion.

References 

Miocene horses
Pliocene horses
Prehistoric placental genera
Transitional fossils
Neogene mammals of North America
Barstovian
Clarendonian
Hemphillian
Fossil taxa described in 1874
Taxa named by Othniel Charles Marsh